This is a list of primary schools in Northern Ireland in which education is primarily conducted in Irish.
There are 39 listed below and in each of the 6 counties, in descending order, there are:
11 in Antrim (Antroim), with 9 in Belfast (Béal Feriste) alone, 
10 in Tyrone (Tír Eoghan), 
8 in Derry (Doire ), 
5 in Down (An Dún)
4 in Armagh (Ard Mhaca) 
1 in Fermanagh (Fear Manach).

Bunscoil an Chaistil, Ballycastle, County Antrim
Bunscoil an Iúir, Newry, County Down
Bunscoil an Traonaigh, Lisnaskea, County Fermanagh
Bunscoil an tSléibhe Dhuibh, Belfast
Bunscoil Ard Mhacha, County Armagh
Bunscoil Bheann Mhadagáin, Belfast
Bunscoil Cholmcille, County Londonderry
Bunscoil Eoin Baiste, Portadown, County Armagh
Bunscoil Mhic Reachtain, Belfast
Bunscoil Naomh Bríd, Maghera, County Londonderry
Gaelscoil Neachtain, Dungiven, County Londonderry
Bunscoil Naomh Colmcille, Carrickmore, County Tyrone
Bunscoil Phádraig & Mhuire, Downpatrick, County Down
Bunscoil Naomh Proinsias, Lurgan, County Armagh
Bunscoil Phobal Feirste, Belfast
Gaelscoil an Lonnáin, Belfast
Gaelscoil an tSeanchaí, Magherafelt, County Londonderry
Gaelscoile Bheanna Boirche, Castlewellan, County Down
Gaelscoil Éadain Mhóir, County Londonderry
Gaelscoil Ghleann Darach, Crumlin, County Antrim
Gaelscoil na bhFál, Belfast
Gaelscoil na Daróige, Derry, County Londonderry
Gaelscoil na Deirge, Castlederg, County Tyrone
Gaelscoil na gCrann, Omagh, County Tyrone
Gaelscoil na mBeann, Kilkeel, County Down
Gaelscoil na Móna, Belfast
Gaelscoil Mhuire, County Tyrone
Gaelscoil na Speiríní, Magherafelt, County Londonderry
Gaelscoil Phádraig Naofa, County Armagh
Gaelscoil Uí Dhochartaigh, Strabane, County Tyrone
Gaelscoil Uí Néill, Coalisland, County Tyrone
Scoil an Droichid, Belfast
Scoil na Fuiseoige, Belfast
Gaelscoil Eoghain, Cookstown, County Tyrone
Gaelscoil na mBeann, Kilkeel, County Down
Gaelscoil na Deirge, Castlederg, County Tyrone
Gaelscoil Aodha Rua, Dungannon, County Tyrone
Gaelscoil Léim an Mhadaidh, Limavady, County Londonderry
Gaelscoil Naomh Phádraig, Gortin, County Tyrone

See also
List of primary schools in Northern Ireland
List of grammar schools in Northern Ireland
List of secondary schools in Northern Ireland
List of integrated schools in Northern Ireland

Primary schools
 
Irish-language education
Irish-language schools and college